Made in Sweden may refer to:

 Made in Sweden (album), an album by E-Type
 Made in Sweden (band), a Swedish band
 Made in Sweden (film), a 1969 Swedish film
 Made in Sweden (TV program), a Swedish television program